Ubiquitin thioesterase OTUB1 also known as otubain-1 is an enzyme that in humans is encoded by the OTUB1 gene. Alternative splicing results in multiple transcript variants.

Function 

Otubain-1 is a member of the OTU (ovarian tumor) superfamily of predicted cysteine proteases. The encoded protein is a highly specific ubiquitin iso-peptidase, and cleaves ubiquitin from branched poly-ubiquitin chains, being specific for lysine48 -linked polyubiquitin but not lysine63 -linked polyubiquitin.  It interacts with another ubiquitin protease and an E3 ubiquitin ligase that inhibits cytokine gene transcription in the immune system. It is proposed to function in specific ubiquitin-dependent pathways, possibly by providing an editing function for polyubiquitin chain growth.

Interactions 
OTUB1 has been shown to interact with RNF128 and GNB2L1.

References

Further reading